Ellen Spiro is an American documentary filmmaker. She was a producer and director of a television documentary Are the kids alright?, which won an Emmy Award in 2005.

She is a professor emerita of the University of Texas at Austin, where she taught graduate and undergraduate courses in documentary, experimental film and music film production. She is a visiting professor at the University of California at Berkeley.

Career

Spiro's work grew out of the AIDS activist movement and tradition of grassroots video activism. Her early work was shot on a compact Sony palmcorder and highlighted gay and lesbian stories. One of her earliest award-winning works, Diana's Hair Ego, was the first small format video to be broadcast on national television.

She created the 10 Under 10 Film Festival in Austin, TX.

In 2006 she was awarded an artist's residency at the Bellagio Center, sponsored by the Rockefeller Foundation, in Bellagio, Italy. She worked with Phil Donahue on Body of War, a film about paralyzed Iraq War veteran Tomas Young, which premiered at the Toronto International Film Festival and won a 'People's Choice Award' and the 'Audience Award for Best Documentary' at the Hamptons International Film Festival. It was shortlisted for nomination for an Academy Award in 2007. In December, Body of War was named Best Documentary of 2007 by the National Board of Review.

She was voted one of the "top 10 professors" by students at the University of Texas in 2018.

Films 
Fixing the Future (2010–2012)
Body of War (2007)
Troop 1500 (2005)
Are the Kids Alright? (2003)
Atomic Ed and the Black Hole (2002)
Roam Sweet Home (1996)
Greetings From Out Here (1993)
Diana's Hair Ego (1991)
Women on the Line: The Effect of Deindustrialization on Women in Buffalo (1988)

References

External links
 
 Ellen Spiro in the Video Data Bank
 Ellen Spiro at Women Make Movies

American documentary film producers
American documentary film directors
American cinematographers
American women cinematographers
University of Texas at Austin faculty
University at Buffalo alumni
1968 births
Living people
Hampshire College faculty
Film festival founders
Artists from New Brunswick, New Jersey
National Endowment for the Arts Fellows
Rockefeller Fellows
Film directors from New Jersey
American women documentary filmmakers
Members of ACT UP